Adrian Favell is Chair in Sociology and Social Theory at the University of Leeds and chercheur associé of the Centre for European Studies at Sciences Po, Paris. He is also a Professorial Academic Associate of the Sainsbury Institute for the Study of Japanese Arts and Cultures and serves as an associate editor of Journal of Ethnic and Migration Studies and on the editorial committee of Journal of Common Market Studies.

Academic career
Adrian Favell has been Professor of Sociology at Sciences Po. Before that he was the Director of Centre for Regional and Global Ethnographies and Professor of European and International Studies at Aarhus University and Professor of Sociology at UCLA.

His research on migration studies has contributed to debates on citizenship, multiculturalism and integration, intra-EU migration, and high skilled migration. He argues for the necessity of sophisticated comparative approaches, which recognise the asymmetry between nation-state contexts of immigration, particularly in comparisons between Britain and France, or European nations and the US and Canada. His work on intra-EU "Eurostars", which uses ethnography as a method, is widely noted as having pioneered study on the everyday consequences of European integration on younger generations of highly mobile European citizens.

His book, Before and After Superflat, is the first academic history in English of contemporary art in Japan since 1990. In Japan, the book became notorious after the artist Yoshitomo Nara angrily challenged online some of its assertions about his mode of organisation and business practices  and.

Works

References

External links
Adrian Favell's departmental profile at the University of Leeds
Adrian Favell's personal page

Year of birth missing (living people)
British sociologists
Living people
Academics of the University of Leeds
Academic staff of Sciences Po
University of California, Los Angeles faculty
Academic staff of Aarhus University